Kenneth Victor McElligott (14 February 1940 – 28 May 2021) was an Australian politician.

He was born in Maryborough. After working as an administrative officer at James Cook University, he was elected to Townsville City Council in 1976. A member of the Labor Party, he became Deputy Mayor in 1980. He held these positions until 1983, when he was elected to the Queensland Legislative Assembly as the member for Townsville, transferring to the new seat of Thuringowa in 1986. Immediately after his election he was appointed Opposition Spokesman on Welfare Services, Youth and Ethnic Affairs, shifting to Health in 1985, to Regional and Northern Development and Small Business in 1987, and to Local Government and Small Business in 1988. With the election of the Goss government in 1989 he became Minister for Health, serving until 1991.  He returned to the front bench in 1995 as the Minister for Lands, serving until the government's defeat on the floor of the Assembly in 1996. McElligott was defeated in 1998 by One Nation candidate Ken Turner.

References

1940 births
2021 deaths
Members of the Queensland Legislative Assembly
Queensland local councillors
James Cook University alumni
People from Maryborough, Queensland
Australian Labor Party members of the Parliament of Queensland